The Intervales State Park is a state park in the state of São Paulo, Brazil.
It protects an area of Atlantic Forest, including parts of the Serra de Paranapiacaba and the Ribeira de Iguape and Paranapanema river basins.

Location

The Intervales State Park has its headquarters in the municipality of Ribeirão Grande, São Paulo.
It includes parts of the municipalities of Ribeirão Grande: , Guapiara: , Sete Barras: , Iporanga:  and Eldorado: .

Other conservation units in the mosaic are the Carlos Botelho State Park, Alto Ribeira Tourist State Park, Nascentes do Paranapanema State Park, Caverna do Diabo State Park,  Xitué Ecological Station, Serra do Mar Environmental Protection Area and Quilombos do Médio Ribeira Environmental Protection Area.

History

The Intervales State Park originated with the Fazenda Intervales (Intervalley Farm), which was managed by Banco Banespa until 1986.
From 1987 it was managed as a park by the Forest Foundation.
97% of the park was the former farm, owned by the Forest Foundation, and the remainder was vacant land owned by the state.
A 1991 UNESCO resolution included the fazenda in the nucleus of the Atlantic Forest Biosphere Reserve.

The Intervales State Park was formally created by state decree 40.135 of 8 June 1995.
In 1999 UNESCO declared it as a Natural World Heritage Site.
The park boundaries were altered by decrees 44.293 of 1999 and law 10.850 of 2001.
As of 2008 the park was well staffed, with 92 personnel in different roles.
There were about 9,000 visitors each year.

Environment
The name Intervales means "between the valleys", and refers to the park's location on the top of the Serra de Paranapiacaba between the basins of the Ribeira de Iguape and Paranapanema rivers.
There are many caves, and rich biodiversity. 

Vegetation is mainly rainforest. Towards the center of the park, where the Serra de Paranapiacaba forms the watershed between the Ribeira do Iguape and Paranapanema basins, more of the flora belong to seasonal semi-deciduous forest.
Fauna include 751 species of invertebrates, 49 fish, 101 amphibians, 44 reptiles, 379 birds and 121 mammals, including 325 species of special interest for conservation.

Facilities

The administrative, maintenance and operational support infrastructure is concentrated at the headquarters.
It includes four lodgings with a capacity of 100 guests, a restaurant, an environmental monitoring center, soccer fields, a playground, housing for researchers and staff residences.
From the headquarters there are short and medium-length trails that give access to waterfalls, caves and belvederes, with stretches of forest in a good state of conservation. 
Visitors may engage in bird watching.
From the Quilombo and Guapiriuvu bases there are trails with access to waterfalls and lookouts.
The Chapel of Santo Inácio e Encanados on the border with the Xitué Ecological Station is of historical and cultural interest.

Gallery

Notes

Sources

State parks of Brazil
Protected areas established in 1995
1995 establishments in Brazil
Protected areas of São Paulo (state)